Marot-Gardon was a French automobile manufacturer, between 1899 and 1904.  The company, based in Corbie, began with the manufacture of racing tricycles, but by 1900 had progressed to the construction of a 4½ cv "miniature carriage".

Vehicles

Initially, three-wheeled tricycles and four-wheelers were produced. In 1899 a small car appeared with a single-cylinder engine with 3 hp and a three speed gearbox. In 1900 the engine output rose to 4.5 hp. By 1901, the range consisted of a model with a front engine, 6 hp and chain drive, as well as a racing car with a built-in engine from Soncin in the rear, which made 7 hp.

A tricycle by Marot-Gardon can be viewed at the Shuttleworth Collection in Biggleswade. Another tricycle is at the Belgrade Automobile Museum.

References
David Burgess Wise, The New Illustrated Encyclopedia of Automobiles.

Defunct motor vehicle manufacturers of France